Nandi Hills is a constituency in Kenya. It is one of six constituencies in Nandi County.
The constituency was established for the 2013 elections after being carved out of Tinderet constituency.

Members of Parliament

References 

Constituencies in Nandi County